The RLU-1 Breezy is a homebuilt aircraft known for its "no cockpit" high wing pusher configuration. It is designed to seat the pilot and passenger with a maximum unobstructed view.

Design and development
Designed and built by Charles Roloff, Robert Liposky and Carl Unger, the original Breezy used a modified set of Piper PA-12 wings. Wings from the  Piper PA-14, Piper PA-18, Piper J-3, Piper J-4, Piper J-5, or Cessna 172 can also be used on the design. It first flew on August 7, 1964.

Operational history

Designer and pilot Carl Unger flew thousands of passengers for free in his Breezy prototype. The aircraft is now part of the EAA AirVenture Museum collection.

At the 2014 EAA AirVenture Oshkosh there was a series of special events to celebrate the 50th anniversary of the design, including a fly-in of Breezys.

Variants
Dawes Breezy
Variant with amphibious floats

Specifications (Breezy)

See also

References

Taylor, John W. R.. Jane's All the World's Aircraft 1982–83. Jane's Publishing Company. London. 1983.

External links

Kit manufacturer catalogue
Air and Space Magazine article

Homebuilt aircraft
High-wing aircraft
Single-engined pusher aircraft
Aircraft first flown in 1964
1960s United States sport aircraft